Lenin Raion is a popular Russian toponym of several city districts in Ukraine commemorating the Russian politician Vladimir Lenin.

It may refer to

Ukraine
 Lenin Raion, Donetsk
 Lenin Raion, Luhansk
 Lenin Raion, Sevastopol

See also
 Illich Raion
 Leninsky District (disambiguation)

Vladimir Lenin